The World People's Conference on Climate Change and the Rights of Mother Earth was a global gathering of civil society and governments hosted by the government of Bolivia in Tiquipaya, just outside the city of Cochabamba on 19–22 April 2010.

Description 

The event was attended by around 30,000 people from over 100 countries, and the proceedings were transmitted live online by OneClimate and the Global Campaign for Climate Action (GCCA). The conference was viewed as a response to what some termed failed climate talks  in Copenhagen during the 15th United Nations Conference of Parties (COP15) climate meetings in December 2009. There have been claims after the Conference ended that there were flaws in its organization and that the Venezuelan government funded it partially.

One of the important objectives of the conference was to produce proposals for new commitments to the Kyoto Protocol and projects in the lead-up to the next UN climate negotiations scheduled during the COP16 meeting in Cancun, Mexico in December 2010.

Conference topics included a Universal Declaration on the Rights of Mother Earth (see external links below), a World People's Referendum on Climate Change, and the establishment of a Climate Justice Tribunal.

The World People's Conference on Climate Change and the Rights of the Mother Earth resulted in a People's Accord.

See also
List of environmental topics

References

Further reading 
 "Why did Copenhagen fail to deliver a climate deal?", "BBC", 22 December 2009.
 Kope, Jerry. "Climate 2010: An Exclusive Conversation With Kumi Naidoo, Executive Director of Greenpeace" "Huffington Post", 31 March 2010. 
 By John Vidal, Allegra Stratton and Suzanne Goldenberg. "Low targets, goals dropped: Copenhagen ends in failure", "The Guardian", 19 December 2009. 
 "Information Guide", World People's Conference on Climate Change and the Rights of Mother Earth official website. Retrieved 8 April 2010.
 Spaces for Movement? Reflections from Bolivia on climate justice, social movements and the state, Building Bridges Collective. Retrieved 29 August 2010.

External links 
 Universal Declaration on the Rights of Mother Earth

 WPCCC "Official website"
 Bolivia Climate Conference Moves to Establish Universal Declaration of the Rights of Mother Earth
 Bolivian UN Ambassador on the World Peoples’ Summit on Climate Change - video report on Democracy Now!

Climate change conferences
Conferences in Bolivia
Radical environmentalism
2010 in the environment
Cochabamba